Ashraf al-Khamaisi (born 1967) is an Egyptian novelist and short story writer. He was born in Luxor.

Carerr
To date, he has published three collections of short stories and two novels. His 2013 novel God's Land of Exile was longlisted for the Arabic Booker Prize. Earlier, his short story "The Four Wheels of the Hand-Pushed Cart" won the top prize in a pan-Arab short story competition organised by Akhbar al-Adab.

He lives and works in Cairo, as an editor for Al-Thaqafa Al-Jadida magazine.

References

Egyptian novelists
People from Luxor
1967 births
Living people
Egyptian male short story writers
Egyptian short story writers
Male novelists
21st-century novelists
21st-century short story writers
21st-century Egyptian writers